Enid Morgan is a former international lawn and indoor bowls competitor for Wales.

Bowls career
In 1977 Morgan won the gold medal in the triples with Margaret Pomeroy and Joan Osborne, a bronze medal in the fours with Pomeroy, Osborne and Janet Ackland, at the 1977 World Outdoor Bowls Championship in Worthing and a silver medal in the team event (Taylor Trophy).

References

Date of birth missing
Welsh female bowls players
Bowls World Champions